Dušan Frosch (born May 8, 1981 in Hradec Králové) is a Czech professional ice hockey player. He is currently an unrestricted free agent having last played for Starbulls Rosenheim in the German Oberliga.

Frosch previously played in the Deutsche Eishockey Liga for Wölfe Freiburg, Straubing Tigers, Kölner Haie, Thomas Sabo Ice Tigers and Iserlohn Roosters. He also played eleven games in the Czech Extraliga for HC Oceláři Třinec.

External links

1981 births
Living people
Czech ice hockey right wingers
EHC Freiburg players
Hokej Šumperk 2003 players
Kölner Haie players
HC Oceláři Třinec players
Sportspeople from Hradec Králové
Rote Teufel Bad Nauheim players
Schwenninger Wild Wings players
Stadion Hradec Králové players
Starbulls Rosenheim players
Straubing Tigers players
Thomas Sabo Ice Tigers players
Czech expatriate ice hockey players in Germany
Naturalized citizens of Germany
Naturalised sports competitors